Girls Who Code (also known as GWC) is an international nonprofit organization that aims to support and increase the number of women in computer science. "Girls who Code" works toward closing the gender employment difference in computing by hosting a seven-week summer Immersion Program, a two-week specialized campus program, after-school clubs, a college club, College Loops, and a New York Times best-selling Penguin 13-book series. The organization is based in New York and has programs in the United States (all fifty states), Canada, India, and the United Kingdom. Girls Who Code has also released many public campaigns to raise awareness of its mission.

Summary
Girls Who Code was founded by Reshma Saujani in 2012, who came up with the idea of creating the organization during her run for the United States Congress. Reshma believed that schools along her campaign route lacked female representation in computer science classrooms. The organization began under the White House Science & Technology Initiative. Girls Who Code runs programs during the academic year teaching high school girls computing skills like programming, robotics, and web design, with sessions including projects and trips to companies like Twitter and Facebook. As of 2014, there were more than 1,500 Girls Who Code clubs across America, with the organization aiming to teach one million girls to code by 2020. By December 2014, three thousand students had completed a Girls Who Code program, 95% of whom stated they desired to major in computer science in higher education. According to the organization's 2021 report, there are approximately 115,000 colleges or post college age alumni who have completed the program.

In 2019, the organization announced plans to expand to 10,000 clubs in all 50 states. In 2020, Girls Who Code launched a free 2-week virtual Summer Immersion Program in response to the COVID-19 pandemic, with the program serving 5,000 girls in its first year.

The organization is sponsored by several software and technology companies, including AOL, Google, and Microsoft, and in August 2014 received a $1 million contribution from AT&T.

History
As of 2015, only 18% of computer science college graduates are women. Reshma Saujani participated in a TED Talk where she spoke about the tech industry. The company announced that in 2016 the non-profit organization would be expanding to all 50 states- making it the largest computing program for girls in the United States. In August 2017, the non-profit launched a 13-book series with Penguin Random House, including a nonfiction book, Girls Who Code: Learn to Code and Change the World, and several fiction books. By the spring of 2018, Girls Who Code will have reached more than 50,000 girls with their computer science education programs.

As of February 2021, Girls Who Code has more than 80,000 college-aged alums who are entering the workforce. Girls Who Code clubs and programs have reached more than 300,000 girls globally as of March 2021.

The organization's efforts to close the achievement gender gap have resulted in several honors. Saujani was recognized for 'her vision and efforts to close the gender gap in technology. Girls Who Code alumni include Andrea Gonzales and Sophie Houser, the creators of the video game Tampon Run.

In 2020, Girls Who Code updated its brand design in order to connect better with Generation Z. The new design is called "making waves" because it is based on the shape of formatted code. The indentations used for formatting code create a wave shape. This new brand update involved many different types of waves, a new color palette, a font change and a single-color logo.

Programs

Clubs 
The Girls Who Code after-school club program is open to middle and high school girls between 13-18. These clubs are run by college students, teachers, librarians or professionals in the technology industry. Club meeting times vary between clubs but are around 20 weeks with 2 hour meetings per week. The club curriculum is built on four foundational computer science concepts: loops, conditionals, variables and functions. The organization calls these the "core-four." Club activities consist of coding tutorials, preprofessional workshops and community building events. Girls Who Code clubs are active in all fifty states in the United States, Canada, India and the United Kingdom.

Summer Immersion Program 
The Summer Immersion Program (SIP) was a seven-week in-person summer camp program offered for girls in 10th and 11th grade to introduce them to the world of coding. The program developed into a two-week virtual program due to the COVID-19 pandemic. These summer camps are based at more than 80 technology companies across the United States, including Facebook, Twitter, Adobe, Prudential, Microsoft and Sephora. The company at which the SIP is based also offers a mentorship program that matches girls in the camp with women in the company. The core curriculum for the program includes lessons on HTML, CSS and JavaScript programming languages with extra material varying between program sites. The program ends with a final group project, project showcase and graduation ceremony.

Partnerships 

In 2016, Girls Who Code partnered with Accenture to work on the future of tech. They subsequently released a report on recommendations to decrease the gender gap in computing.

Dell Technologies has partnered with the organization to support after school programs for young girls.

On October 11, 2018, Girls Who Code partnered with TikTok starting the hashtag #raiseyourhand.  The app has announced to give US$1 for every video posted using the hashtag with a maximum of $10,000.

As of 2020, Girls Who Code has partnered with American Girl to create a doll who empowers girls to grow confidence and interest in technology. The doll, Courtney Moore, is an avid gamer who codes her own video game while dressed in 80's fashion. From September 2020 to December 2020, American Girl matched customer donations up to $50,000 to Girls Who Code. The organization also created four scholarships, each $5,000, for Girls Who Code members for furthering their computer science education.

In December of 2021, Girls Who Code partnered with Doja Cat and Active Theory to create DojaCode, an interactive music video to the star's single 'Woman'. The interactive video introduced participants to three coding languages and allowed them to modify the appearance of the music video visuals using said languages. This was intended to get more teen girls interested in programming.

Girls Who Code has had a partnership with weapons manufacturer Raytheon since 2018. The company, which is known for manufacturing weapons such as the Tomahawk missile, has donated $1 million to the organization in 2021. Since August 2022, the pair worked together to launch Girls Who Code's Leadership Academy geared for college age girls. This 4 month program is open to over 100 college students. The purpose of the program is to expose students to the technology industry in order to grow their technical and professional skills. The curriculum of the program involves a mentorship program, professional events such as speed networking and interview preparation, as well as, a community-service based project.

Campaigns 
Girls Who Code started a digital march called the #MarchforSisterhood. This campaign called for women and allies to post themselves marching for a cause they care about. Posts involve a video or picture of participants either holding a sign that says "I march for..." with the latter half filled in or stating who/what they march for.

For Super Bowl 2020, Girls Who Code partnered with Olay to make a Super Bowl commercial. The commercial featured Lilly Singh, Busy Philipps, Taraji P. Henson, Katie Couric and, retired astronaut, Nicole Stott. The commercial was inspired by the first all-female spacewalk from October 2019. Olay donated $1 to Girls Who Code for each time #MakeSpaceForWomen was used on Twitter.

In 2020, Girls Who Code released the campaign "Missing Code." The campaign involved a series of videos that depict applications such as Instagram and Netflix glitching out. These glitches were caused when code written by women were removed. The purpose of the campaign was to depict what the internet would look like if all the code written by women vanished and if women were not part of the technology industry.

International Expansion 
In November 2018, Girls Who Code expanded to Canada. This was the organization's first international expansion. With the help of Morgan Stanley and the Federation of Ontario Public Libraries, Girls Who Code has launched at least 10 after-school clubs across Ontario. The expansion was announced at the Move the Dial Summit.

As of August 2022, Girls Who Code has also expanded to India in order to increase the number of women engineers in India from 26%. The organization partnered with United Technologies to offer a virtual two week Summer Immersion Program, virtual six week self paced program and after school clubs.

Girls Who Code has also expanded to the United Kingdom.

Controversy 
In 2020-2021, four titles from the Girls Who Code books series, The Friendship Code, Team BFF: Race to the Finish!, Lights, Music, Code! and Spotlight on Coding Club!, were banned from the Central York school district in Pennsylvania. The books were listed on the PEN America's Index of School Book Bans for a 10-month period from November 2020 to September 2021. These books were also on a resource list created by the district's diversity committee which had other banned books such as The Handmaid's Tale. Saujani stated that the banning was linked to the Moms for Liberty group. The group has not confirmed this. The Moms for Liberty co-founder, Tina Descovich, said that the group is only concerned with banning material that would give their children easy access to sexually explicit content and pornography.

See also
Black Girls Code
Native Girls Code
Women Who Code
I Look Like an Engineer

References

External links

Reshma Saujani's talk at TEDxGotham 2011 on Girls Who Code (YouTube video) 
Reshma's TED2016 Talk, "Teach Girls Bravery, Not Perfection"

Non-profit organizations based in the United States
Computer science education
Organizations established in 2012
Women in computing
2012 establishments in the United States